Rawicz is a town in central Poland.

Rawicz may also refer to:
Rawicz County
Gmina Rawicz in Rawicz County
Rawicz, Łódź Voivodeship
Rawicz (surname)
Rawicz Coat of Arms
 The pianist Marjan Rawicz (1898-1970), of the piano duo Rawicz and Landauer